Atpadi is a taluka in Sangli district of Maharashtra, in 2022 it is one of the talukas of the district, belonging to the Vita sub-division of the district. In 2012 the taluka suffered a severe drought, reportedly the worst in living memory, similar conditions were faced in 2016 and 2019, in 2020 the taluka was hit by floods that caused losses to lives and properties. India's best quality pomegranates are grown in the taluka and the taluka is a pioneer amongst exporters of the fruit, though adverse climatic conditions and diseases have hit the growers. There is a proposal and demand that Sangli district be split to form a new Mandesh district, with Atpadi taluka being one of the talukas to be included in this new district.

Swatantrapur Vasahat
Swatantrapur Vasahat an open jail. It holds life term inmates. It is located in the taluka.

Footnotes

References

Talukas in Maharashtra